Gino's may refer to:

Gino's East, a Chicago-based pizzeria chain
Gino's Hamburgers, a recently revived fast food chain originating in Baltimore
Gino's Pizza and Spaghetti, a pizzeria chain in West Virginia
 Geno's Steaks, a restaurant in Philadelphia
 Frank and Gino's, restaurant in Eastern Canada
 Papa Gino's, a restaurant chain based in Dedham, Massachusetts, USA

See also
Jeno's Pizza (disambiguation)
 Gino (disambiguation)